Kenan Cronjé (born 29 April 1995) is a South African rugby union player, currently playing with the Rut Griffons (rugby union). He is a  regular position is flanker or lock.

Rugby career

2014: Boland Under-19

Cronjé was born in Worcester. While he never represented his local  team at youth weeks while at schoolboy level, he linked up with their Under-19 team for the 2014 Under-19 Provincial Championship. He started five of their seven matches during the regular season in Group B of the competition, helping Boland finish in second position, losing just a single match. A week later, he also started their promotion play-off match against , but the team fell short, losing 33–53 to remain in Group B.

2015–present: Boland Cavaliers and Under-21

He came on for the final quarter of an hour of the match, and scored his first senior try within 12 minutes of his senior bow, a 78th minute consolation in a 24–62 defeat. One more appearance off the bench against the  completed a miserable season for a Boland team that finished second-bottom on the log.

Cronjé remained in the first team throughout 2016.

References

South African rugby union players
Living people
1995 births
Rugby union players from Worcester, South Africa
Rugby union locks
Rugby union flankers
Rugby union number eights
Boland Cavaliers players
Griffons (rugby union) players